Marie-Élisabeth Ozanne (1739–1797) was a French painter.

Born in Paris, Ozanne was the sister of marine artist Nicolas Ozanne; in 1763 she was received by the Académie de Saint-Luc, and in the following year exhibited portraits in pastel. Her work is reminiscent of that of portraitist . Her brother-in-law was Jean-Pierre Moreau; he is the individual who registered her death, which occurred at 105 rue de la Tixeranderie in Paris.

References

1739 births
1797 deaths
French women painters
18th-century French painters
18th-century French women artists
French portrait painters
Pastel artists
Painters from Paris
Sibling artists